NACAC may refer to:

National Association for College Admission Counseling
 North America, Central America and Caribbean Athletic Association